Albert Weinert (June 13, 1863 – November 29, 1947) was a German-American sculptor.

Born in Leipzig, Germany, Weinert attended the Royal Academy of Art and Applied Art there and then the Académie Royale des Beaux-Arts in Brussels, Belgium.

In 1886, he emigrated to the United States, working first in San Francisco before moving to Chicago in 1892 to work on the World's Columbian Exposition where he met fellow sculptor Karl Bitter. After the fair, Weinert traveled with Bitter to New York City where he worked in Bitter's studio. He later relocated to Washington, D.C. where, in April 1894, he was hired to work on the design of the Thomas Jefferson Building of the Library of Congress. He was paid $10 per day to oversee a crew of modelers and carvers.

He died on November 29, 1947, in his home studio on Grand Concourse in the Bronx.

Work

 Haymarket Martyrs' Monument, German Waldheim Cemetery, Chicago, 1893
 The Court of Neptune Fountain, Library of Congress, Washington, D.C.
He produced the granite dolphins carved on the spandrels behind the bronze groups by Perry  1898
 Numerous details in the Library of Congress, notably in the Reading Room.
 The Battle of Lake George, Lake George Battlefield Park, Lake George, New York  1903
 William McKinley Monument, Toledo, Ohio,  1903
 Stevens T. Mason, Detroit,  1908 
 Cecil Calvert Monument, Baltimore,  1908

References

1863 births
1947 deaths
20th-century American sculptors
20th-century American male artists
19th-century American sculptors
American male sculptors
National Sculpture Society members
19th-century American male artists